Chiquihuitillos is an archeological site located in the city and municipality of Mina in the Nuevo León State, México. In general throughout northeastern Mexico archaeological wealth is priceless. The site has impressive petroglyphs, is considered an important area in the regional context.

Where there is nothing, in the heart of the desert, within the limits of Mina, Villa Aldama and Bustamante, is one of the sites with the highest concentration of cave paintings in Mexico. This is Chiquihuitillos, a set of several hills containing a series of rocky shelters where ancient tribes painted impressive drawings in rock and imprinted elements of their cosmos view.

First, it is an important concentration of cave paintings and secondly the manifestations show similarities with a number of other contiguous sites in the region, so we can speak of a tradition

The area was formerly inhabited by native Alzapas, that spoke the Coahuilteco language. It is not certain how many people lived there, since it does not seem to be a residential place, rather seems to be a place for visitors and not residential, currently there is no water in the vicinity.

While it is true that these ancient tribes left no traces of pyramids, as it is the case of other mesoamerican cultures, however this heritage, provide new evidence for comprehension of the past.

Specialists coincide in the northeastern area has a different archaeological heritage, but just as important as the rest of the country. There is an erroneous perception that in the north there is nothing, and therefore has dismissed archaeological study of the cultural processes.

While the Chiquihuitillos cave painting are not pyramid structures, the importance and the monumentality of these painting manifestations of on ravines and cliffs is truly impressive.

The Site
Researchers say that the area was where ceremonies were performed and contemplated the stars, but with a unique referential style among anthropologists.

According to William Breen Murray (archaeologist and UDEM Professor), Chiquihuitillos represent one of the most important points of cave art manifestations in a regional context. “First it is an important concentration of cave paintings and second demonstrations show similarities with a number of other contiguous sites in the region, hence it can be discussed as a full fledge tradition”.
 
The paintings zone is very large, dominates much of the landscape in the surroundings of the site. The bottom of the Hill has thousands of rocks with petroglyphs.

There are petroglyphs in the base and the top of the plateau. There is no similarity between the paintings and the rock motifs, could very well belong to completely separate traditions and in general we would talk about the petroglyphs being older, but in this case, the paintings show specific similarities with cave paintings located in the Rio Grande, right at the Pecos River mouth.

The Pecos style is dated with some precision and goes back about four thousand years, approximate age of the paintings.

Chiquihuitillos style
The style is widely distributed in the region, in an area extending about 60 kilometers to the North, in the municipalities of Villa Aldama, Bustamante and Lampazos, as far as Candela in Coahuila. The immediate zone includes Mina, García and a place located in Ramos Arizpe.

Chiquihuitillos style is distinctive because the paintings are polychrome, with red, white, black, orange and yellow colors.

It is considered that some of the paintings are astronomical motifs, but as a whole, the place is not defined by astronomy as a whole.
 
Chiquihuitillos site represents one of the most important such demonstrations in a regional context in rock paintings, its name was given to a petroglyphs style. The style is widely distributed in the region.

Cave Painting Exploration 
Northeast prehistory has been surrounded by mystery up to date; hence the book has the task of reproducing some of the lost pages. Collected articles reproduced finds of the last fifty years that reveal important aspects and seek recognition of the northeast rock art. Spanish work is combined - including original preparations for this compilation – with other translated from English, in some cases for the first time, giving access to Mexica researchers to these contributions. Northeast rock art demonstrates the value of scientific collaboration to overcome a political and cultural barrier that was defined in the 19th century, and which has no importance in the past, including prehistory.

The above information provides new regional prehistory perspectives. The discovery of the site is recognition of what was already there, but had been invisible for the notion that northeastern Mexican prehistory did not exist. Both villagers and archaeologists found remnants of Native Americans without value and little or no interest. Today we know that cave images offer almost intimate access to the lifestyle prevailing during the prehistory of the hunter-gatherer groups. Helps appreciate the knowledge generated by the direct dependence of nature and its use by means of simple but effective technology. Opens the view of a new and more complex prehistory, both in time and space.

The northeastern cave painting art covers two types of manifestations; rock engravings, also called petroglyphs, and cave paintings (pictogram or pictograph). A third type of cave painting art, are geoglyphs, thus far has not been detected in the region.

Petroglyphs are by far the most common. Used various techniques - such as picking and scraping - to make the figures, whether representing images, abstract symbols or simple marks on native rocks. On the other hand, cave painting uses natural pigments applied directly on rock surfaces and survives in protected areas, from destructive natural elements. Instruments used for the work can be from a single pointed stone to a feather pen or human finger, but the use of these instruments is transient and rarely recognizable in archaeological records.

In spite of different techniques, often engraving and painting are associated in the same places and represented motifs are repeated in both techniques. Clearly correspond to traditions or cultural activities related, that allow us to treat them both as northeastern rock art, a more precise explanation of their differences remains pending.

Cave painting art is found in all human occupied continents, it is a world heritage, as proclaimed by UNESCO. Its antiquity goes back to the dawn of human prehistory. In France and Spain, the most ancient cave paintings date back to thirty thousand years Before Present or BP.

Cave Painting Art - Northeastern México
In the American Continent, these manifestations occur from one end of the continent to the other and can be traced back to the first settlers. In northeastern Mexico, human occupation is confirmed at least to the end of the last Ice age, approximately 10,500 BP. Some sites have earlier occupations, Radiocarbon dated to the early archaic period in the Americas, as is the case in Boca de Potrerillos, in Mina, dating back to 7600 BP., and Cueva Ahumada, García, from 6000 BP. It cannot be safely claimed that cave art in Chiquihuitillos is as old, but there is a possibility.

Research by Dr. Solveig A. Turpin, found several cave sites with this style in the north of Coahuila, establishing its diffusion to the south, on the Mexican side of the border. The Chiquihuitillos style definition, the Chiquihuitillos pictographs in the Mexican northeast indicates differences found in Nuevo León cave painting, but also found other similarities resulting from Shamanism practices associated with peyote use in both areas.

See also
Boca de Potrerillos
Cueva Ahumada
List of caves in Mexico

Notes

References
Hacia la definición de un estilo: Las pictografías de Chiquihutillos en el noreste Mexicano. Solveig A. Turpin, Herbert H. Eling y Moisés Valadez Moreno. The Chiquihuitillos Style, William Breen Murray. (Spanish)

Archaeological sites in Mexico
Archaeological sites in Nuevo León
Petroglyphs in Mexico